Delhaize Serbia (full legal name: Delhaize Serbia d.o.o. Beograd) or Delhaize Maxi, is a Serbian supermarket chain owned by Ahold Delhaize, with headquarters in Belgrade. Founded in 2000, the chain has around 482 stores in Serbia. As of 2016, it has 20.60% market share in Serbia.

History
In Serbia, Maxi became the biggest retail company by acquiring companies C-market and Pekabeta. In March 2011, Ahold Delhaize bought Maxi supermarket chain from Serbian Delta Holding for a sum of 932.5 million euros.

Since 2013, Maxi and Tempo are no longer operating in Montenegro and Albania.

Since 2014, Maxi and Tempo are no longer operating in Bosnia and Herzegovina. The company "Tropic Group" from Banja Luka bought the ownership of 39 retail supermarkets (Tempo, Maxi) from "Delhaize BiH".

Locations

Serbia

Maxi is expanding quickly across Serbia, and plans to have a chain in the entire Balkan region. Some current locations are in the following cities:

{|width="50%"
|valign="top"|

See also

 List of supermarket chains in Serbia
 Ahold Delhaize
 Tempo Centar - the cash and carry/hypermarket version of Maxi

References

External links
 

2011 mergers and acquisitions
Ahold Delhaize
Companies based in Belgrade
D.o.o. companies in Serbia
Retail companies established in 2000
Retail companies of Serbia
Serbian brands
Supermarkets of Montenegro
Supermarkets of Serbia
Serbian companies established in 2000